Sir Henry Moore, 1st Baronet (7 February 1713 – 11 September 1769) was a British colonial leader who served as governor of Jamaica and as royal Governor of Province of New York from 1765 to 1769.

Early life
Moore was born in Vere Parish, Jamaica to a prominent plantation family, and was educated toward the law. Moore was active in Jamaica's colonial affairs.

Lieutenant Governor of Jamaica
By 1756, Moore had risen to the rank of lieutenant governor. As in many royal colonies of the time, the governor was frequently absent, collecting his fees and salary from London, with a local Lieutenant and council forming the actual government. In 1760, Moore gained a considerable reputation for leadership by suppressing Tacky's War, a slave rebellion. Under Moore's leadership, the Jamaican Maroons of Nanny Town, Charles Town, Jamaica and Scott's Hall were summoned to help the colonial forces suppress the revolt.

Nanny Town was reportedly renamed Moore Town in his honour.

Career in New York
Moore's reward for good performance as Jamaica's governor was first to be made a Baronet, and then in 1764 he was named royal governor for New York. He arrived in New York City with his family in November 1765. Relations between the colonies and England were strained by this time, but not yet in open rebellion. New York City had seen riots and protests over the Stamp Act. The new governor calmed these by meeting directly with Isaac Sears, a leader of the Sons of Liberty. Moore agreed with Sears and the colony's assembly to suppress the Stamp Act, and gained additional goodwill by reducing military fortifications within the city. His openness and courtesy earned him floral tributes while other colonial governors were being burned in effigy.

However, during the next few years, he actively used military force to suppress rural riots by tenants of the large estate owners. He ordered General Thomas Gage to actively pursue and suppress this form of rebellion. This did not seem to bring him any increased difficulty in governing, for two reasons: that the Sons of Liberty also feared the introduction of rural problems into the city, believing that they should be the only ones to use riots as a bargaining tactic; and that the assembly at the time was dominated by the patroons, or large estate owners. In December 1767 Moore even dissolved the assembly to allow the patroons to make up through new elections some of the numbers they had lost earlier.

Death
Moore died suddenly while in office in New York City in 1769. The duties of governor then fell on Lieutenant Governor Cadwallader Colden, whose term was much less peaceful. Moore left with the respect of almost all the colony's leadership, the only exception being certain religious fundamentalists angered by his efforts to create a theatre or playhouse.

He was succeeded in the baronetcy by his thirteen-year-old son John Henry Moore, 2nd Baronet, who died in 1780 aged 23.

Personal
Moore married Catherine Maria Long, a member of another prominent Jamaica family, in 1765. They had several children, and after Henry's death, Catherine moved to England. Catherine's Peak (altitude 1158 metres) in Jamaica is named after her, as local legend reports her to be the first woman to climb the peak.

References

External link

Moore, Henry
Moore, Henry
Moore, Henry
Moore, Henry
Moore, Henry, 1st Baronet
British slave owners